The Bengals–Ravens rivalry is a National Football League (NFL) rivalry between the Cincinnati Bengals and the Baltimore Ravens. The rivalry began in 1996 when the Ravens were created after the Cleveland Browns, with whom the Bengals also share a rivalry, moved to Baltimore.

The two rivals have played twice annually since 1996 when the Ravens assumed the Browns' spot in the former AFC Central Division.  Both teams were placed in the AFC North during the 2002 NFL realignment.  The Ravens lead the overall series, 28–27.  However, the Bengals won the teams’ lone playoff meeting in the 2022 Wild Card Round.

Notable games 
November 3, 1996:  Bengals 24, Ravens 21  In the first game in the history of the series, the Ravens took a 21–3 lead into halftime.  The Bengals scored 21 unanswered 2nd half points to win 24–21.
October 19, 2003:  Bengals 34, Ravens 26  This was Bengals' head coach Marvin Lewis' first game against the Ravens.  Lewis previously served as the Ravens defensive coordinator from 1996 to 2001, including their Super Bowl XXXV title in 2000.
December 5, 2004: Bengals 27, Ravens 26  The Bengals overcame a 20–3 fourth quarter deficit to win 27–26.
September 10, 2007:  Bengals 27, Ravens 20  This season-opening Monday Night Football game was best remembered for a touchdown celebration by Bengals' WR Chad Johnson, who is known for his touchdown celebrations.  After a score, he donned a gold jacket, resembling the jackets given to Pro Football Hall of Fame inductees, that read "Future H.O.F. 20??" on the back.
November 10, 2013:  Ravens 20, Bengals 17  The Ravens built a 17–0 lead at halftime before the Bengals rallied to make it 17–10 with two seconds left. In the final play of regulation, Bengals quarterback Andy Dalton threw a h 49-yard Hail Mary pass. Despite being initially tipped, wide receiver A. J. Green ran toward the ball and caught it to tie the game at 17–17 at the end of regulation. However, the Ravens would win in overtime, 20–17.
September 7, 2014:  Bengals 23, Ravens 16  Bengals kicker Mike Nugent kicked five field goals in the first half, tying an NFL record for most field goals kicked in a half.
December 31, 2017:  Bengals 31, Ravens 27  In the final game of the regular season in Baltimore, Bengals QB Andy Dalton threw a go-ahead touchdown pass to Tyler Boyd in the closing seconds to give the Bengals, finishing at 7-9, an improbable win over the now-9–7 Ravens.  This win, combined with a Buffalo Bills win that day, eliminated the Ravens from playoff contention.
November 18, 2018: Ravens 24, Bengals 21 Ravens start 2018 first round draft pick Lamar Jackson at quarterback for the first time, he breaks the franchise rushing record for a QB with 117 yards. This marked Marvin Lewis' final game in the series, as he left the Cincinnati franchise at the end of the season.
December 26, 2021: Bengals 41, Ravens 21 In 2021, Cincinnati completed a season-sweep over Baltimore with a 41–21 victory at home. Bengals quarterback Joe Burrow threw for 525 yards in this game, setting a Bengals franchise record.
AFC Wild Card Round January 15, 2023: Bengals 24, Ravens 17 The first playoff game in the rivalry's history. Sam Hubbard scored on a 98-yard fumble return, the longest in postseason history, as Cincinnati registered a 24–17 victory.

Season-by-season results 

|-
| 
|style="| Bengals 2–0
|style="| Bengals  24–21
|style="| Bengals  21–14
| Bengals  2–0
| Ravens inaugural season.
|-
| 
| Tie 1–1
|style="| Ravens  23–10
|style="| Bengals  16–14
| Bengals  3–1
| 
|-
| 
|style="| Ravens 2–0
|style="| Ravens  31–24
|style="| Ravens  20–13
| Tie  3–3
| Ravens open M&T Bank Stadium (then known as PSINet Stadium)
|-
| 
|style="| Ravens 2–0
|style="| Ravens  22–0
|style="| Ravens  34–31
| Ravens  5–3
| 
|-

|-
| 
| style="| Ravens 2–0
| style="| Ravens  37–0
| style="| Ravens  27–7
| Ravens  7–3
| Bengals open Paul Brown Stadium.  Ravens win Super Bowl XXXV
|-
| 
| Tie 1–1
| style="| Ravens  16–0
| style="| Bengals  27–10
| Ravens  8–4
|  
|-
| 
| style="| Ravens 2–0
| style="| Ravens  38–27
| style="| Ravens  27–23
| Ravens  10–4
| 
|-
| 
| Tie 1–1
| style="| Ravens  31–13
| style="| Bengals  34–26
| Ravens  11–5
| Bengals hire former Ravens defensive coordinator Marvin Lewis as head coach.  Ravens win 7 straight meetings at home 
|-
| 
| Tie 1–1
| style="| Bengals  27–26
| style="| Ravens  23–9
| Ravens  12–6
|
|-
| 
| style="| Bengals 2–0
| style="| Bengals  21–9
| style="| Bengals  42–29
| Ravens  12–8
|
|-
| 
| Tie 1–1
| style="| Ravens  26–20
| style="| Bengals  13–7
| Ravens  13–9
| 
|-
| 
| style="| Bengals 2–0
| style="| Bengals  21–7
| style="| Bengals  27–20
| Ravens  13–11
|
|-
| 
| style="| Ravens 2–0
| style="| Ravens  17–10
| style="| Ravens  34–3
| Ravens  15–11
| Ravens hire head coach John Harbaugh, draft QB Joe Flacco
|-
| 
| style="| Bengals 2–0
| style="| Bengals  17–14
| style="| Bengals  17–7
| Ravens  15–13
| Bengals win all of their division game for the first time in franchise history
|-

|-
| 
| Tie 1–1
| style="| Ravens  13–7
| style="| Bengals  15–10
| Ravens  16–14
| 
|-
| 
| style="| Ravens 2–0
| style="| Ravens  31–24
| style="| Ravens  24–16
| Ravens  18–14
| Bengals draft QB Andy Dalton, first meetings between Dalton and Joe Flacco. Ravens win all games against division opponents.
|-
| 
| Tie 1–1
| style="| Ravens  44–13
| style="| Bengals  23–17
| Ravens  19–15
| Ravens win Super Bowl XLVII
|-
| 
| Tie 1–1
| style="| Ravens  20–17(OT)
| style="| Bengals  34–17
| Ravens  20–16
| Only overtime meeting in the series history
|-
| 
| style="| Bengals 2–0
| style="| Bengals  23–16
| style="| Bengals  27–24
| Ravens  20–18
| Bengals K Mike Nugent kicks 5 field goals in the first half of the game in Baltimore, tying the NFL record for field goals in a half.
|-
| 
| style="| Bengals 2–0
| style="| Bengals  28–24
| style="| Bengals  24–16
| Tie  20–20
|  
|-
| 
| Tie 1–1
| style="| Ravens  19–14
| style="| Bengals  27–10
| Tie  21–21
| 
|-
| 
| Tie 1–1
| style="| Bengals  31–27
| style="| Ravens  20–0
| Tie  22–22
| Bengals win the final game of the season in Baltimore to eliminate the Ravens from playoff contention. 
|-
| 
| Tie 1–1
| style="| Ravens  24–21
| style="| Bengals  34–23
| Tie  23–23
| Lamar Jackson makes his NFL Debut as a starting Quarterback in the Game in Baltimore
|-
| 
| style="|Ravens 2–0
| style="| Ravens  23–17
| style="| Ravens  49–13
| Ravens  25–23
| 
|-

|-
| 
|style="| Ravens 2–0
|style="| Ravens  27–3
|style="| Ravens  38–3
| Ravens  27–23
| Ravens clinch playoff berth in their victory in Cincinnati in week 17.
|-
| 
|style="| Bengals 2–0
|style="| Bengals  41–17
|style="| Bengals  41–21
| Ravens  27–25
| Bengals' win in Baltimore was their largest win in the rivalry. Bengals QB Joe Burrow throws for 525 yards, sets Bengals franchise record in game in Cincinnati. Bengals lose Super Bowl LVI.
|-
| 
| Tie 1–1
|style="| Ravens  19–17
|style="| Bengals  27–16
| Ravens  28–26
|
|- style="background:#f2f2f2; font-weight:bold;"
| 2022 Playoffs
|style="| Bengals 1–0
|
|style="| Bengals 24–17
| Ravens  28–27
| AFC Wild Card Round. First postseason meeting in the series.
|-

|-
| Regular Season
|style="| Ravens 28–26
| Ravens 18–9
| Bengals 17–10
|
|-
| Postseason games
|style="| Bengals 1–0
| no games
| Bengals 1–0
| 2022 AFC Wild Card Round. 
|-
| Regular and postseason 
| style="| Ravens 28–27
| Ravens 18–9
| Bengals 18–10
| 
|-

References 

Cincinnati Bengals
Baltimore Ravens
National Football League rivalries
Baltimore Ravens rivalries
Cincinnati Bengals rivalries